The following are the national records in athletics in Cuba maintained by its national athletics federation: Federación Cubana de Atletismo (FCA).

Outdoor

Key to tables:

+ = en route to a longer distance

h = hand timing

A = affected by altitude

a = aided road course according to IAAF rule 260.28

Men

Women

Indoor

Men

Women

References

External links

Cuba
Records
Athletics
Athletics